Harvey Levy may refer to:

 Harvey Levy (American football) (1902–1986), American football player
 Harvey Levy (academic), American geneticist